David Saltzberg is a professor of physics and astronomy at the University of California, Los Angeles. Saltzberg received a Sloan Fellowship, NSF Career Award, and Department of Energy Outstanding Junior Investigator Award while an assistant professor. Saltzberg earned a bachelor's degree in physics in 1989 from Princeton University and a Ph.D. in physics from the University of Chicago in 1994. From 1995-97 he worked at CERN in Switzerland. His research interests include high-energy collider physics and the radio detection of cosmic neutrinos.

Saltzberg is also known for his work as technical director on the CBS comedy The Big Bang Theory. In addition to reviewing and correcting scripts with technical errors, Saltzberg added complex formulae to whiteboards on set.  David also had established scientists visit the set of The Big Bang Theory through his "Geek of the Week" program. He has also been a science consultant on the WGN America series Manhattan.

The asteroid 8628 Davidsaltzberg is named after him.

References

External links
 Profile at UCLA Physics & Astronomy department
 Saltzberg's blog discussing science behind each Big Bang Theory episode
 

21st-century American physicists
Living people
Place of birth missing (living people)
Princeton University alumni
University of California, Los Angeles faculty
University of Chicago alumni
Year of birth missing (living people)
People associated with CERN